The Waalhaven is a harbour in Rotterdam, Netherlands. It is one of the excavated harbors on the south bank of the Maas in Rotterdam. With its area of 3.1 square kilometers, it is the larger dug harbor basins in the world.

Waalhaven Airport 
The Waalhaven district used to be home to an airport, Vliegveld Waalhaven (Waalhaven Airport). It was the second civilian airport in the Netherlands and was opened in 1920. Part of it was also in use by the Dutch military's 3rd JaVA Fokker G.I squadron in 1940.

Amongst others, the N.V. Koolhoven aircraft factory was located at this airport. The factory and airport were destroyed in 1940 by the Dutch army so it could not get into the hands of the Germans. After the Second World War, the city was in a prospect of finding an airport, but the existing airfield at Waalhaven was written off the list, because the damage that was caused to prevent the airfield's capture was so great it was considered not worth repairing. An industrial zone now replaced the former airport, with aviation having moved to Zestienhoven Airport.

Defunct airports in the Netherlands
Airports in South Holland
Buildings and structures in Rotterdam
History of Rotterdam
Port of Rotterdam
Transport in Rotterdam